King of Africa is a 1968 film.

Cast
Ty Hardin
Pier Angeli
Rossano Brazzi
George Sanders
Simon Sabela

Production
The film was based on an original story by Jack De Witt for producer Sandy Howard. Howard said "we feel we have an African James Bond" in the story. Filming was to begin in April 1967.

By April, Jack Lamont was set to direct, the title was changed to King and filming was pushed back to May.

Pst production was done in Madrid.

References

External links
King of Africa at IMDb
1968 films